Tony Pollard may refer to:

Tony Pollard (archaeologist) (born 1965), British archaeologist
Tony Pollard (American football) (born 1997), American football running back